Interior with a Woman Weighing Gold Coin (1659–1662) is an oil-on-canvas painting by the Dutch painter Pieter de Hooch. It is part of the collection of the Gemäldegalerie, Berlin.

The painting was documented by Hofstede de Groot in 1910, who wrote:96. Interior with a Woman weighing Gold Coin. A woman stands in profile in a room, weighing gold coin. Her rich dress, trimmed with fur, suggests that she is the wife of a wealthy money-lender. It is a picture of rare beauty. Canvas, 24 inches by 21 1/2 inches. Sales, (Probably) Beckford, London, 1823 (£30:9s., Evans). Brun of Geneva, Paris, November 30, 1841, No. 20 (865 francs).

The composition is strongly related to Vermeer's Woman Holding a Balance.

References

External links
Woman Holding a Balance, ca. 1659-1662 in the RKD

1660s paintings
Paintings in the Gemäldegalerie, Berlin
Paintings by Pieter de Hooch